D12, an American hip-hop group, has released two studio albums and five singles. Their music has been released on record label Interscope Records, along with subsidiary Shady Records. D12 has earned three platinum certifications from the Recording Industry Association of America (RIAA). In this discography, music videos and collaborations are included as well.

D12's debut album Devil's Night was released in 2001. The album reached the number one spot on the Billboard 200 and reached the top spot on various charts internationally. The album received a platinum certification from the RIAA and sold almost two million copies in the United States.

In 2004, D12's second album, D12 World, debuted at number one on the Billboard 200, and received two platinum certifications in the United States from the RIAA. The lead single "My Band" became D12's first song to enter the top ten of the Billboard Hot 100.

Studio albums

Extended plays

Mixtapes
 Detroit, What! (Demo Tape) (2000)
 Mixtape (Limited Edition) (2003)
 Return of the Dozen (2008)
 Return of the Dozen Vol. 2 (2011)
 Devils Night: Reloaded (2015)

Singles

Music videos

Guest appearances

Footnotes

References 

Hip hop discographies
Discographies of American artists